Major General Tôn Thất Xứng (1923–2018) was an officer of the Army of the Republic of Vietnam.

He served as the commander of I Corps, which oversaw the northernmost part of the country, from 30 January 1964 until 14 November of the same year, when he was replaced by Lieutenant General Nguyễn Chánh Thi. Xứng was installed on the day of the successful coup by General Nguyễn Khánh that toppled the military junta of General Dương Văn Minh.

Notes

References 

Army of the Republic of Vietnam generals
2018 deaths
1923 births